Alejandro Terrones (born 21 August 1951) is a Mexican sailor. He competed in the 470 event at the 1984 Summer Olympics.

References

External links
 

1951 births
Living people
Mexican male sailors (sport)
Olympic sailors of Mexico
Sailors at the 1984 Summer Olympics – 470
Sportspeople from Mexico City